Coreura lysimachides is a moth of the subfamily Arctiinae. It was described by Herbert Druce in 1897. It is found in Ecuador and Peru.

References

Euchromiina
Moths described in 1897